Ian Tittle (born 28 October 1973) is a West Indian cricket player. He represents the Leeward Islands and Antigua & Barbuda in West Indies domestic cricket. He also represented Antigua and Barbuda in the cricket tournament at the 1998 Commonwealth Games.

References
CricketArchive profile

Leeward Islands cricketers
1973 births
Living people
Cricketers at the 1998 Commonwealth Games
Antigua and Barbuda cricketers
People from Saint John Parish, Antigua
Commonwealth Games competitors for Antigua and Barbuda